Olší is the name of several locations in the Czech Republic:

 Olší (Brno-Country District), a village in the South Moravian Region
 Olší (Jihlava District), a village in the Vysočina Region